Margaret Block is a historic three-story building in Great Falls, Montana. It was designed in the Prairie School style by architect Hiram N. Black, and built in 1914 by A. W. Kingsbury. The first floor was used for retail, including a jewelry store, and the second and third floors were a hotel. It has been listed on the National Register of Historic Places since August 2, 1984.

References

National Register of Historic Places in Cascade County, Montana
Commercial buildings completed in 1914
1914 establishments in Montana
Commercial buildings on the National Register of Historic Places in Montana
Buildings and structures in Great Falls, Montana
Prairie School architecture in Montana